Plej are an electronic DJ band from Gothenburg, Sweden. The two members are brothers Arvid Niklasson and Erik Niklasson. They signed in 2002 to the music label Exceptional Records where they released their first album Electronic Music From The Swedish Leftcoast in 2003. EMSL was nominated for a swedish grammy in 2004.  

They released their second album, Home Is Where Your Heart Was, on July 28, 2008.

Swedish electronic music groups